Lucedale is a city in George County, Mississippi, United States. It is part of the Pascagoula, Mississippi Metropolitan Statistical Area. Lucedale was founded in 1901 when Governor A.H. Longino signed his name and his seal to the proclamation. It was named after its founder, Gregory Marston Luce, who operated a lumber business there. The population was 2,923 at the 2010 census, up from 2,458 at the 2000 census. It is the county seat of George County.

Geography
Lucedale is located in northern George County at  (30.919824, -88.591669). Mississippi Highway 198 passes through the city as Main Street, leading east  to U.S. Route 98 and northwest  to Mississippi Highway 63, both of which are four-lane highways bypassing Lucedale. US 98 leads southeast  to Mobile, Alabama, and northwest  to Hattiesburg, while Highway 63 leads north  to Leakesville and south  to Pascagoula.

Demographics

2020 census

As of the 2020 United States census, there were 2,869 people, 975 households, and 504 families residing in the city.

2000 census
As of the census of 2000, there were 2,458 people, 916 households, and 628 families residing in the city. The population density was 646.2 people per square mile (249.7/km2). There were 1,052 housing units at an average density of 276.6 per square mile (106.9/km2). The racial makeup of the city was 69.45% White, 29.21% African American, 0.20% Native American, 0.73% Asian, 0.12% from other races, and 0.28% from two or more races. Hispanic or Latino of any race were 0.37% of the population.

There were 916 households, out of which 31.4% had children under the age of 18 living with them, 45.0% were married couples living together, 20.6% had a female householder with no husband present, and 31.4% were non-families. 29.4% of all households were made up of individuals, and 14.4% had someone living alone who was 65 years of age or older. The average household size was 2.44 and the average family size was 3.01.

In the city, the population was spread out, with 26.9% under the age of 18, 10.1% from 18 to 24, 24.8% from 25 to 44, 20.1% from 45 to 64, and 18.1% who were 65 years of age or older. The median age was 36 years. For every 100 females, there were 94.8 males. For every 100 females age 18 and over, there were 88.6 males.

The median income for a household in the city was $22,604, and the median income for a family was $29,338. Males had a median income of $27,386 versus $18,313 for females. The per capita income for the city was $12,151. About 23.9% of families and 26.1% of the population were below the poverty line, including 40.3% of those under age 18 and 19.1% of those age 65 or over.

Education

Lucedale is served by the George County School District. As of 2010, the district spends US$6,732 per pupil—63% on instruction, 30% on support services, and 7% on other elementary and secondary expenditures—and 15 students existed for every full-time equivalent teacher.

Healthcare
The city of Lucedale and George County are served by the George Regional Health Facilities. Formerly known as the George County Hospital, the current George Regional Hospital serves George, Green, Stone and Jackson counties, as well as western Mobile County in Alabama. In addition to a nursing home, the hospital operates the Community Medical Center, an affiliated primary care facility. Surgical services are provided by the Community Surgical Center.

In April 2013, a US$4.5 million extension for the George Regional Hospital was commenced. The project will add acute care space to George Regional Hospital, expand George Regional Health & Rehab Center to 60 beds, and will add 24 larger, private rooms to the nursing home. A February 2014 completion date is expected.

Notable people
 Ruthie Bolton, Olympic gold medalist basketball player
 Janice Lawrence Braxton, Olympic gold medalist basketball player
 Carolyn Cochran, 1955 Miss Mississippi
 Ty Fryfogle, football wide receiver for the Indiana Hoosiers
 Carolyn Haines, author, also credited as Caroline Burnes
Annibel Jenkins, English professor, scholar
 Alonzo Lawrence, football defensive back
 Jake W. Lindsey, recipient of the Medal of Honor
 Dee McCann, professional football player
 Doug McLeod, member of the Mississippi House of Representatives
 Eric Moulds, professional football player
 John Nix, professional football player
 Justin Steele, professional baseball player
 Claude Passeau, professional baseball player

References

External links
City of Lucedale official website

Cities in Mississippi
Cities in George County, Mississippi
County seats in Mississippi
Cities in Pascagoula metropolitan area